I Am Nemesis is the eighth full-length album by the German metalcore band Caliban, which was released on 3 February 2012 on Century Media.

Background 
Lyrically, I Am Nemesis is a continuation of the band's last record, Say Hello to Tragedy, and focuses on controversial and often overlooked world issues. The guitarist Marc Görtz told: "The album breaks new soil without forgetting our roots. There are new influences such as shimmering guitar melodies and technical grooves with Meshuggah-like heaviness. It was important to us to have an elaborate album without any fillers. Additionally, the sound of the album is the best we've ever had by far: it is heavy and brutal without being chaotic."
Marcus Bischoff of Heaven Shall Burn and Mitch Lucker of Suicide Silence are confirmed as guest vocals.

Release and promotion 
The first track off the album "Memorial" premiered on 19 December, as a music video on the website Metal Hammer Germany., and the second single "Dein R3.ich" was released on 6 January 2012. The album entered the German Media Control chart at No. 21. Caliban promoted the album through their "Get Infected" Tour 2012 with support of Winds Of Plague, We Butter the Bread with Butter, Eyes Set To Kill and Attila which started off on 2 February in Karlsruhe, Germany. Due to personal reasons All Shall Perish had to cancel the tour, they are replaced by Winds of Plague.

Track list 
All songs written by Marc Görtz. All lyrics written by Andreas Dörner except where noted.

Credits 

Caliban
 Andreas Dörner – lead vocals
 Denis Schmidt – rhythm guitar, clean vocals
 Marc Görtz – lead guitar
 Marco Schaller – bass, backing vocals
 Patrick Grün – drums

Guest musicians
Marcus Bischoff (Heaven Shall Burn) – guest vocals on "We Are the Many"
Mitch Lucker (Suicide Silence) – guest vocals on "We Are the Many"
Benny Richter (The Mercury Arc) – guest vocals on "We Are the Many", keyboards on "Dein R3.ich" and "The Bogeyman", production
Christoph Koterzina – clean vocals on "Modern Warfare", backing vocals on "Open Letter"
As Blood Runs Black – gang vocals

Production
Marc Görtz – producer
Klaus Scheuermann – mixing
J. Oliver Wiebe – mastering
Marcel Neumann  – co-producer on "Dein R3.ich", "The Bogeyman" and "Deadly Dream"
Mark K. Kraemer for Twenty-Dirt – artwork

Release history

Charts

References 

Caliban (band) albums
2012 albums